Bayli Mckeithan, known professionally as Bayli (stylized all caps), is an American pop and R&B singer.

Career

The Skins 
Bayli was the lead vocalist of Brooklyn-based rock band The Skins, which she formed as a teenager with her siblings Reef (drummer) and Kaya (bassist and vocalist), as well as with friends Russel Chell and Daisy Spencer (guitarists). The band was signed by Rick Rubin and released an EP, Still Sleep. The Skins went on tour with DNCE.

Rolling Stone named The Skins as one of their top ten new artists to know in 2016.

In 2018, The Skins went on hiatus after leaving their label; they eventually made an amicable decision to disband.

Solo career 
Bayli grew more interested in songwriting after the disbandment of The Skins, and with the encouragement of friends, decided to work as a solo artist. In explaining the decision, she stated that she felt her purpose was to share what she was creating, and that she needed to release her own music to "gain clarity." Bayli released her solo debut single, "MYOB: Or Whatever" in 2018. The song was co-written with Justin Tranter. She subsequently released R&B single "Underneath," which featured on her mixtape "SUMMER."

In 2020, Bayli released singles "sushi for breakfast," "boys lie," and "clown shit."

Bayli released single "16" in 2021. The song described her mother's life story, as well as her ambition and influence on Bayli; it was reworked into a memorial song after her unexpected death. It and previous singles were included in debut EP, stories from new york, which also released in 2021. Bayli said the EP's concept "came naturally," as after making songs for the project, she noticed they all had a common thread relating to her New York City background, stating that "with all the ways the city has influenced my identity with music and art and fashion and even my family's identity too, it just felt so right." The EP also embodies her desire to share stories from a new perspective: "As a Black woman, as a queer person, as a person at the intersection of all these things, I would love to be there to tell new stories. That’s what stories from new york is."

In 2022, Bayli received broad recognition for her single "TELLY BAG", an ode for her love of the Telfar bag. The Fader featured the single as a "Song You Need." It and Paper praised "TELLY BAG" for its "effortless breeziness" and "laidback vibes." Reviewers noted "TELLY BAG"'s explicit queerness and connection to queer culture, with BroadwayWorld describing it as a "gay anthem."

Bayli released a second EP, Stories 2, in October 2022. Following the release, she went on tour with Magdalena Bay.

Metro Weekly spotlighted Bayli as an Editor's Pick musician.

Collaborations 
Bayli has had several official remixes for her singles: "sushi for breakfast" with Junglepussy, "boys lie" with SEBii, and "clown shit" with Sophie.

Bayli collaborated with Gia Woods on the single "Spend It."

Personal life 
Bayli has stated she does not have a specific label she uses in terms of her sexuality, which is on a spectrum; however, she does identify as queer and gay.

Influences 
Bayli has cited The Miseducation of Lauryn Hill as a musical influence.

Discography

Extended plays

References 

21st-century American women singers
American women pop singers
American women singer-songwriters
American LGBT singers
Living people
20th-century American LGBT people
21st-century American LGBT people
Year of birth missing (living people)